This is a non-exhaustive list of facial hairstyles.

Moustache styles
A moustache is defined as any facial hair grown specifically on the upper lip. There are many different types of moustache, but all differentiate between hair grown exclusively on the upper lip and hair grown on other parts of the face (which would make the facial hair a beard).

Beard styles
The simple term beard is an umbrella term which can include any style of facial hair that isn't clean shaven or just a moustache.

Goatee styles

Partial beard styles

Full-beard styles
A full-beard which shows full, unmodified growth on all available areas of the face and neck, including the moustache, chin, sideburns, and cheeks.

See also
 Beard oil
 Discrimination based on hair texture
 List of hairstyles
 Moustache styles
 Peak beard
 Pigtail Ordinance

References

External links

 List of Beard Styles at beards.org

Facial hair styles
Facial hairstyles
Cultural trends